Andrei Cherkasov won in the final 6–2, 6–1, against Tim Mayotte and with this he became the first winner of the Kremlin Cup

Seeds

  Andrés Gómez (first round)
  Emilio Sánchez (quarterfinals)
  Magnus Gustafsson (first round)
  Richey Reneberg (second round)
  Alexander Volkov (quarterfinals)
  Marc Rosset (second round)
  David Wheaton (second round)
  Andrei Cherkasov (champion)

Draw

Finals

Top half

Bottom half

External links
 Draw

Kremlin Cup
Kremlin Cup